Naima Hazell (born 11 June 2005) is a Saint Lucian swimmer.

In 2019, she represented Saint Lucia at the 2019 World Aquatics Championships held in Gwangju, South Korea. She competed in the women's 50 metre freestyle event. She did not advance to compete in the semi-finals. She also competed in the women's 50 metre breaststroke event and in this event she also did not advance to compete in the semi-finals.

References 

Living people
2005 births
Place of birth missing (living people)
Saint Lucian female swimmers
Saint Lucian female freestyle swimmers
Female breaststroke swimmers